Valery Ivanovich Shaveyko (born February 4, 1956, Minsk) is a  Soviet football player, Master of Sports of the USSR (1979), Russian coach, referee, and inspector.

As a child, he played tennis, boxing, judo. In 10 years, won the society Dynamo championship on Greco-Roman wrestling at the age of 14 years. The pupil of the Minsk-5 Sports School, coach Leonid Lapunov. Since 1974, he was part of the FC Dinamo Minsk. Held for the team for seven seasons, he resigned from it after head coach Eduard Malofeev Shaveyko accused in the delivery of the home match with Neftçi PFK (0: 2).

In 1981, Shaveyko decided to go to Moscow FC Torpedo Moscow where he played the familiar Kruglov, Petrenko, Vassiliev, Prigoda. This was announced in Minsk, and Shaveyko as acting ensign, was ordered to come to the part. He still refused to play for Dynamo, for which he was disqualified for life with the reasoning "for grabbers attitude to football".  Disqualification soon took off, and Shaveyko advocated the  Torpedo  until 1987. Winner of the USSR Cup 1986 Cup 1982 finalist spent two games in  FC Pakhtakor in 1988, and later appeared in Poland in the Russian championship playing for FC Metallurg Novotroitsk and FC Lada Dimitrovgrad.

In 1996–2004, he worked as a football referee in the top flight, spending 48 matches. After conducting the November 7, 1999 match FC Lokomotiv (St. Petersburg)  – FC Tyumen was banned for two years and had no right to judge the top division games.

In 2007, he was appointed Deputy Director FC FShM Torpedo Moscow.
Since 2008 the inspector of football matches.

References

External links
 Статистика игр в еврокубках

1956 births
Living people
Footballers from Minsk
Russian football referees
Soviet footballers
Russian footballers
FC Dinamo Minsk players
FC Torpedo Moscow players
Pakhtakor Tashkent FK players
Russian football managers
FC Nosta Novotroitsk players
Association football defenders